Tamara Orejuela (born 23 June 1953) is an Ecuadorian former swimmer. She competed in two events at the 1968 Summer Olympics. She was the first woman to represent Ecuador at the Olympics.

References

External links
 

1953 births
Living people
Ecuadorian female swimmers
Olympic swimmers of Ecuador
Swimmers at the 1968 Summer Olympics
Swimmers at the 1967 Pan American Games
Pan American Games competitors for Ecuador
Sportspeople from Guayaquil
20th-century Ecuadorian women